Barbara Pollastrini (born 30 September 1947 in Darfo Boario Terme, Province of Brescia) is an Italian politician and university professor.

During the Protests of 1968, she joined the Maoist organization Servire il Popolo, becoming also the director of the Milan office.

After obtaining a degree at the Bocconi University in Milan, and a period of study at École pratique des hautes études in Paris, France, she started teaching at the University of Milan.

She joined the Italian Communist Party and become the leader of the Milan office, after a period as city councillor.

She retired from politics when was indicted for political corruption during the inquiry called Mani pulite, until her acquittal in 1996. She subsequently joined the Democratic Party of the Left and in 1999, she became head of the women group of the Democrats of the Left.

During the general election in 2001, she was elected at the Chamber of Deputies. On 17 May 2006, she was nominated Minister for Equal Opportunity during the Prodi II Cabinet, working on DiCo bill, with the Minister of Family, Rosy Bindi.

Since 23 May 2007, she has been a member of the National Committee for the Democratic Party. On 7 May 2017, Pollastrini has been appointed Vice President of the Democratic Party, representing the left-wing of the party.

References

1947 births
Living people
People from Darfo Boario Terme
Bocconi University alumni
Democrats of the Left politicians
Democratic Party of the Left politicians
20th-century Italian politicians
Democratic Party (Italy) politicians
21st-century Italian politicians
21st-century Italian women politicians
20th-century Italian women politicians
Women government ministers of Italy